The International Dublin Literary Award, established as the International IMPAC Dublin Literary Award in 1996, is presented each year for a novel written or translated into English. It promotes excellence in world literature and is solely sponsored by Dublin City Council, Ireland. At €100,000, the award is one of the richest literary prizes in the world. If the winning book is a translation (as it has been nine times), the prize is divided between the writer and the translator, with the writer receiving €75,000 and the translator €25,000. The first award was made in 1996 to David Malouf for his English-language novel Remembering Babylon. 

Nominations are submitted by public libraries worldwide – over 400 library systems in 177 countries worldwide are invited to nominate books each year – from which the shortlist and the eventual winner are selected by an international panel of judges (which changes each year).

Eligibility and procedure
The prize is open to novels written in any language and by authors of any nationality, provided the work has been published in English or English translation. The presentation of the award is post-dated by two years from the date of publication. Thus, to win an award in 2017, the work must have been published in 2015. If it is an English translation, the work must have been published in its original language between two and six years before its translation. The scope for inclusion has been subject to criticism; according to The Irish Times journalist Eileen Battersby, "many of the titles are already well known even at the time of the publication of the long list."

Dublin City Public Libraries seek nominations from 400 public libraries from major cities across the world. Libraries can apply to be considered for inclusion in the nomination process. The longlist is announced in October or November of each year, and the shortlist (up to 10 titles) is announced in March or April of the following year. The longlist and shortlist are chosen by an international panel of judges which rotates each year. Allen Weinstein was the non-voting chair of the panel from 1996 to 2003. As of 2017, the former Chief Judge of a US Court of Appeals, Eugene R. Sullivan, is the non-voting chair. The winner of the award is announced each June.

History
The award was established in 1994 as the International IMPAC Dublin Literary Award, a joint initiative of Dublin City Council and the American productivity company IMPAC, which had its European headquarters in Dublin. James Irwin, president of IMPAC, established the prize money at €100,000. A trust fund was established to pay for the award and its maintenance. The award has been administered by Dublin City Public Libraries since its inception. IMPAC went defunct in the late-2000s when its founder and president James Irwin died in 2009. In late 2013, the trust fund became exhausted and there was no money left to run the award. The council agreed to step in and continue funding the award under the same brand name of the now-defunct company while seeking a new sponsor. It was reported that the council paid €100,000 for the prize plus €80,250 in administration costs in 2015. The award was subsequently renamed the International DUBLIN Literary Award in November 2015.

Describing the award as "the most eclectic and unpredictable of the literary world's annual gongs", the journalist Michelle Pauli posed the question in relation to the longlist for the 2004 edition: "Where would you find Michael Dobbs and Tony Parsons up against Umberto Eco and Milan Kundera for a €100,000 prize?"

Winners and shortlists

1990s

2000s

2010s

2020s 

 – debut novel

Wins by language

References

External links
 

Culture in Dublin (city)
Municipal awards
Awards established in 1996
English-language literary awards
Fiction awards
International literary awards
Irish literary awards